Arthur Robert Grady (5 August 1922 – June 1995) was a British water polo player. He competed in the men's tournament at the 1956 Summer Olympics.

See also
 Great Britain men's Olympic water polo team records and statistics
 List of men's Olympic water polo tournament goalkeepers

References

External links
 

1922 births
1995 deaths
Water polo goalkeepers
British male water polo players
Olympic water polo players of Great Britain
Water polo players at the 1956 Summer Olympics
People from Croydon